Mariandyrys is a village in the community of Llangoed, Ynys Môn, Wales, which is 132.2 miles (212.7 km) from Cardiff and 208.5 miles (335.4 km) from London.

Within the community and to the west of the village centre is an SSSI which is also a Nature Reserve managed by North Wales Wildlife Trust. It comprises an area of limestone grassland and heath with views to Snowdonia and the coast of Anglesey.

References

See also 
 List of localities in Wales by population

Villages in Anglesey